is a Japanese shōjo manga artist.

She made her debut in 1977 with Yakusoku ("Promise") in Lyrica. In 1988, she won the Kodansha Manga Award for shōjo for Junjō Crazy Fruits, which was serialized in the manga magazine Bouquet from 1982 to 1988.

Matsunae is known for her romantic comedies. Rachel Thorn mentions worklife for women, divorce and casual sex as issues that show up in her work.

References

External links 
 Profile at The Ultimate Manga Page
 Romantic Kingdom  - database of Akemi Matsunae's works

Japanese female comics artists
1956 births
Manga artists
Winner of Kodansha Manga Award (Shōjo)
Women manga artists
Female comics writers
Living people
People from Tokyo
Japanese women writers